Roti is a 2017 Nigerian film which was directed and written by Kunle Afolayan.

Plot
Diane and Kabir who are a married couple lose their 10-year-old son Roti to heart disease. Diane who was the mother was in a lot of grief, she later saw a boy who she believes was her son, she became happy again but she was told that Juwon is not Roti's reincarnation, so she has to let go.

Cast
 Kate Henshaw
 Kunle Afolayan
 Toyin Oshinaike
 Fathia Balogun 
 Darimisire Afolayan

References

2017 films
Nigerian drama films